Cartoon Network HD+ (CN HD+) is an Indian cable and satellite television channel that primarily broadcasts animated series. Operated by Warner Bros. Discovery under its international division. It was launched on April 15, 2018 as the high definition counterpart of Cartoon Network India.

The channel was only available in India and was eventually launched on popular operators in neighbouring countries. Many Cartoon Network originals are shown exclusively on this channel.

History 
WarnerMedia India announced the launch of Cartoon Network's high definition television channel, which would be named Cartoon Network HD+. Prior to its launch on April 15, 2018, the SD channel aired advertisements promoting the HD channel. A promo was being aired named "Loud and Clear!", which served as the slogan of the channel until eventually being discontinued after two months.

On April 17, 2018, alongside English, Tamil and Telugu audio tracks were added to Cartoon Network HD+. Programs which are earlier broadcast by Cartoon Network SD channel like We Bare Bears, The Powerpuff Girls, etc, are also broadcast in Hindi, Tamil, and Telugu.

In 2021, along with the SD channel, Cartoon Network HD+ occasionally aired several Ben 10 Specials, such as Ben 10 Versus the Universe: The Movie.

On 30 March 2022, both the SD and HD channels began using the "Redraw Your World" branding and graphics.

See also
 Pogo (TV channel)
 HBO (India)
 WB Channel
 CNN International

References

External links
Cartoon Network India official website
Official Youtube Channel

Cartoon Network
Children's television channels in India
English-language television stations in India
Hindi-language television channels in India
Tamil-language television channels
Telugu-language television channels
Television stations in Mumbai
High-definition television
Television channels and stations established in 2018
2018 establishments in Maharashtra
Warner Bros. Discovery Asia-Pacific